Elaeocyma drilliaeformis is an extinct species of sea snail, a marine gastropod mollusk in the family Drilliidae.

Description

Distribution
This extinct species was found in strata of the Lutetian in France.

References

External links
 Muséum National d'Histoire naturelle: Elaeocyma plicata

drilliaeformis